Aulis Reinikka (21 October 1915 – 4 March 1998) was a Finnish athlete. He competed in the men's pole vault and the men's decathlon at the 1936 Summer Olympics.

References

1915 births
1998 deaths
Athletes (track and field) at the 1936 Summer Olympics
Finnish male pole vaulters
Finnish decathletes
Olympic athletes of Finland
Place of birth missing